Cabramatta High School (abbreviated as CHS) is a government-funded co-educational comprehensive secondary day school, located on Aladore Avenue, Cabramatta, a south-western suburb of Sydney, New South Wales, Australia. 

Established in 1958, the school enrolled approximately 1,500 students in 2018, from Year 7 to Year 12, of whom one percent identified as Indigenous Australians and 96 percent were from a language background other than English. The school is operated by the NSW Department of Education in accordance with a curriculum developed by the New South Wales Education Standards Authority.

History

Cabramatta High School is the local high school of Cabramatta, an urbanised suburb located in south-west Sydney. The school was established in 1958 as the suburb's first high school. Cabramatta High School is becoming increasingly popular within the region, with impressive records of academic and practical successful students, mostly achieving grade-averages higher than most other schools in the local area. Well known for its multiculturalism, Cabramatta High School consists of a very diverse range of students and staff, with majority coming from non-English speaking backgrounds, predominantly Vietnamese and Chinese. Cabramatta High School has been praised by many people in the public for its great diversity of students with the great conception of multiculturalism and peace of many different cultures in enabling an enjoyable location to learn.

The school created a peace garden as a memorial to students' family history going through the war. A documentary featuring the school's garden was broadcast on ABC TV.

The Australian Chamber Orchestra in late 2005 chose Cabramatta High School as the first school to be in their new education program.

On 25 October 2006, the school was selected as the first school in south-west Sydney to have a Respect Acceptance Participation (RAP) Day for student representatives from secondary school and Intensive English Centres across South Western Sydney Region.

The school celebrated their 50th anniversary with a banquet at the local restaurant.

On 21 November 2008, the Class of 88 (86 for Year 10) celebrated their 20th year reunion at the Barclay Lounge. The event was attended by a strong turnout of former students and also a number of teachers were there to celebrate the evening.

In recent years, Cabramatta High School has caught the eyes of many well-known stars, including Australian Idol's Jessica Mauboy, Australia's Got Talent's Justice Crew, singer Israel Cruz, as well as Jet Valencia, the director of Australia's Got Talent's Kookies n Kreme.

A major make-over was completed at the school, with large sums of money being spent on creating a better environment for students and staff. Throughout 2013, many construction work were completed, which led to the introduction of many new classrooms, as well as a new dance studio.

Peace Day 

The school's successful annual Peace Day celebrations continued to deliver warm welcomes to recipients of the Sydney Peace Prize, With the releasing of the "Cabramatta doves", the Sydney Peace Prize winners helped mark the special occasion with the rest of the school and the community.

Notable alumni 

 Steve Ella1980s Australian Kangaroo rugby league player
 Jon Englishmusician, actor and writer
 Sue Hinesaward-winning children's author
 Ognjen Matichandball player; Australia national handball team
 Lomalito Moalaboxer; bronze medalist at the 2010 Commonwealth Games

See also 

 List of government schools in New South Wales
 Education in Australia

References

External links 
 

Public high schools in Sydney
Rock Eisteddfod Challenge participants
School buildings completed in 1958
Cabramatta, New South Wales
Educational institutions established in 1958
1958 establishments in Australia